Polestar is the official Volvo Cars performance company and brand.

Pole star, polestar or polar star may refer to:

 Pole star, a bright star that is approximately aligned with the axis of rotation of a planet
Polaris, North pole star of the Earth
 Polestar (comics), a Spider-Man villain
 Cosmic Boy or Polestar, a DC Comics Superhero of the Legion of Super-Heroes
 Polar  Star (novel), a 1989 novel by Martin Cruz Smith
 Polestar Racing Group, an American motorsport team currently competing in the Atlantic Championship
 Polestar Racing, a Swedish motorsport team currently competing in the STCC and V8 SuperCars Championship
 "Polar Star" (song), a song by F.T. Island
 Polestar, a monument in Letterkenny
 Polestar, the company of Philip Segal
 Polestar, developed the Japan-exclusive game Magical Pop'n
 Polestar Preschool, an area in the SNES RPG EarthBound
 Polyarnaya Zvezda (disambiguation) (Russian-language titles)
 Polar Star (Decembrist journal)

Ships

 MS Polstjerna, a former Norwegian sealing ship
 MV Polar Star, a former cruise ship by Polar Star Expeditions
 NLV Pole Star, a lighthouse tender vessel
 RV Polarstern, a German research icebreaker
 USCGC Polar Star (WAGB-10), an icebreaker

See also
 Polestar Xeus, a solution for monitoring cloud systems
 Polar (cataclysmic variable star), a type of star
 Order of the Polar Star Swedish order of Chivalry
 Order of the Polar Star (Norway)